Fancy pants may refer to:

 Fancypants, a 2011 comedy/drama film
 Fancy Pants (film), a 1950 comedy film
 "Fancy Pants" (The Angry Beavers), an episode of The Angry Beavers
 The Fancy Pants Adventures, a 2011 Adobe Flash game by Brad Borne
 Fancy Pants (album), a 1983 album by Count Basie
 "Fancy Pants" (Al Hirt song), 1965
 "Mr. Fancy Pants", a song by Jonathan Coulton from the album Thing a Week Four
 "Hey There Fancypants", a song by Ween from Quebec
 "Fancypants Manifesto", a song by Lemon Demon from Hip To The Java Bean
 Lyle Beerbohm (born 1979), mixed martial arts fighter nicknamed "Fancy Pants"